The 1996 German Athletics Championships were held in Cologne on 21–23 June 1996.

Results

Men

Women

References 
 Results source: 

1996
German Athletics Championships
German Athletics Championships